The 2001–02 C.D. Marathón season in the Honduran football league was divided into two halves, Apertura and Clausura. Marathón was capable to win one tournament, having achieved the third championship in their history.

Apertura

Squad

Standings

Matches

Results by round

Regular season

Semifinals

 Marathón won 3-2 on aggregate.

Final

 Motagua 3-3 Marathón on aggregate; Motagua won 5–3 on penalty shootouts.

Clausura

Squad

Standings

Matches

Results by round

Regular season

Semifinals

 Marathón won 2–1 on aggregate.

Final

 Marathón won 4–1 on aggregate.

Total scorers 

Only at Clausura.

Matches played

References

External links
Marathon Official Website 

CD Mara
C.D. Marathón seasons